Joseph Delach was an American soccer right half, coach, team executive and league president who spent his entire professional career with Pittsburgh Beadling.  He is a member of the National Soccer Hall of Fame.

Delach played for Pittsburgh Beadling from 1935 until his retirement as a player in 1946.  He also coached the team into the early 1960s.  He served as President of the Keystone League from 1962 to 1983 and was commissioner of the National Amateur Cup for ten years.

Delach is a member of the Beadling Hall of Fame and was inducted into the National Soccer Hall of Fame in 1973.

References

External links
 National Soccer Hall of Fame profile

1910 births
1975 deaths
American soccer coaches
American soccer players
American soccer chairmen and investors
National Soccer Hall of Fame members
Pittsburgh Beadling players
20th-century American businesspeople
Association football midfielders